The Music Scene is the fourth solo studio album by American hip hop producer Blockhead. It was released on Ninja Tune on November 3, 2009. It received generally favorable reviews from critics.

Critical reception

At Metacritic, which assigns a weighted average score out of 100 to reviews from mainstream critics, the album received an average score of 75, based on 9 reviews, indicating "generally favorable reviews".

Rick Anderson of AllMusic commented that "Everyone makes sample-based music these days, but very few people use found sounds and prefab musical snippets as creatively and thoughtfully as Blockhead does."

Sarah Ferguson of Exclaim! said, "The music found on The Music Scene broadcasts a place for explorative musical journeying much greater than one found on pop radio." 

Ben Hogwood of MusicOMH wrote, "For Blockhead, this album would seem to open up a whole new realm of possibilities, showing as it does an ability to break out of the confines of hip hop, which he had already mastered."

Track listing

Personnel
Credits adapted from the CD liner notes.

 Blockhead – production
 DJ Signify – co-production (11), turntables (1, 12)
 Damien Paris – guitar (7, 9), bass guitar (3, 7, 8, 10)
 Wilder Zoby – vocoder (9)
 Baby Dayliner – mixing
 Kevin Metcalfe – mastering
 Owen Brozman – artwork
 Matt Rota – color, design

References

External links
 

2009 albums
Blockhead (music producer) albums
Ninja Tune albums